Miskinli or Misginli may refer to:
Miskinli, Gadabay, Azerbaijan
Miskinli, Shamkir, Azerbaijan